Ilie Datcu (born 20 July 1937), also known as İlyas Datça is a Romanian former football goalkeeper and coach.

Club career
Ilie Datcu was born on 20 July 1937 in Bucharest, Romania. He started his career playing at the junior squads of Constructorul București in 1950, continuing at Metalul Câmpina and Progresul CPCS București, before he started his senior career in 1958 at Divizia B team, Dinamo Obor București for which he played three seasons, reaching the 1960 Cupa României Final which was lost with 2–0 in front of Progresul București. He went to play for Dinamo București where he made his Divizia A debut on 20 August 1961 in a 4–3 away loss against Dinamo Pitești, making a total of 20 league appearances in his first season, helping the team win the title. In the following three seasons Datcu won another three titles, in the first he played 13 games, in the second he played 26 games and in the third he made 24 appearances. After 8 seasons spent with The Red Dogs in which he also won two Cupa României, he went to play for in Turkey for Fenerbahçe where in his first season he was coached by Traian Ionescu and was teammate with Ion Nunweiller, all of them previously working together at Dinamo, winning the Turkish League in which he made 29 appearances in which he conceded only 6 goals, also winning the TSYD Cup in which he kept a clean sheet in the 1–0 victory from the final against Beşiktaş Istanbul. In the following seasons he won another title in the 1973–74 season, making 21 appearances, also winning another TSYD Cup and a Chancellor Cup in 1973 and a Turkish Cup in 1974. Datcu ended his career by spending the 1975–76 season at Giresunspor, he has a total of 166 matches played in Divizia A, 130 matches in the Turkish League and 22 appearances in European competitions.

International career
Ilie Datcu played six games at international level for Romania, making his debut on 12 May 1963 under coach Silviu Ploeșteanu in a friendly which ended with a 3–2 victory against East Germany. He played two games at the Euro 1968 qualifiers and also played for Romania's Olympic team and participated at the 1964 Summer Olympics in Tokyo where he made four appearances, helping the team finish in the 5th place.

Managerial career
Ilie Datcu started his managerial career at Fenerbahçe with whom he won the TSYD Cup. He spent his entire career in Turkey, coaching numerous teams, also working as a goalkeeper coach at Fenerbahçe where he noticed and promoted Rüştü Reçber and at Beşiktaş Istanbul where he was bought by his former teammate Mircea Lucescu.

Honours

Player
Dinamo Obor București
Cupa României runner-up: 1959–60
Dinamo București
Divizia A: 1961–62, 1962–63, 1963–64, 1964–65
Cupa României: 1963–64, 1967–68
Fenerbahçe
Turkish League: 1969–70, 1973–74
Turkish Cup: 1973–74
Turkish Super Cup: 1973
Chancellor Cup: 1973
TSYD Cup: 1969, 1973

Manager
Fenerbahçe
TSYD Cup: 1976

Notes

References

External links

1937 births
Living people
Footballers from Bucharest
Romanian footballers
Romania international footballers
Romanian football managers
Olympic footballers of Romania
Footballers at the 1964 Summer Olympics
Liga I players
Liga II players
Süper Lig players
Expatriate footballers in Turkey
Romanian expatriate sportspeople in Turkey
Romanian expatriate footballers
Victoria București players
FC Dinamo București players
Fenerbahçe S.K. footballers
Giresunspor footballers
Romanian expatriate football managers
Expatriate football managers in Turkey
Fenerbahçe football managers
Eskişehirspor managers
Göztepe S.K. managers
Naturalized citizens of Turkey
Association football goalkeepers